was a prefectural junior college in Isogo-ku, Yokohama, Kanagawa Prefecture, Japan, established in 1968. It closed in 2011.

The school specialized in teaching English, Chinese, French and Spanish languages.

External links
 Official website 

Educational institutions established in 1968
Public universities in Japan
Universities and colleges in Yokohama
Japanese junior colleges